Silvestre Enrique Faya Viesca (born 15 July 1952) is a Mexican politician from the National Action Party. From 2002 to 2003 he served as Deputy of the LVIII Legislature of the Mexican Congress representing Coahuila.

References

1952 births
Living people
Politicians from Torreón
National Action Party (Mexico) politicians
21st-century Mexican politicians
Deputies of the LVIII Legislature of Mexico
Members of the Chamber of Deputies (Mexico) for Coahuila